Urgleptes gahani is a species of beetle in the family Cerambycidae. It was described by Chalumeau in 1983.

References

Urgleptes
Beetles described in 1983